Ungheni is a commune in the southwestern part of Argeș County, Muntenia, Romania. It is composed of six villages: Colțu, Găujani, Goia, Humele, Satu Nou and Ungheni.

Nearby localities are Recea (to the east), Miroși (to the south), Stolnici (to the west) and Buzoești (to the north). The National Road DN65A Pitești - Costești - Roșiorii de Vede - Turnu Măgurele goes through Ungheni. The nearest river is Teleorman.

References

Communes in Argeș County
Localities in Muntenia